Dingxin Zhao (Chinese: 赵鼎新; born 1953) is a Chinese sociologist and the Max Palevsky Professor Emeritus of Sociology at the University of Chicago.  His book, The Power of Tiananmen State-Society Relations and the 1989 Beijing Student Movement, is widely considered the definitive work on the 1989 Tiananmen Square protests and massacre.  He is also a former mathematical ecologist, and has doctorates in both entomology and sociology. His areas of specialization include political sociology and the sociology of social movements.

References

University of Chicago faculty
Year of birth missing (living people)
Living people
Chinese sociologists
1989 Tiananmen Square protests and massacre